Bouliachelys is an extinct genus of sea turtle from Cretaceous Australia. Its parent taxon is the clade Dermochelyoidae.

References

External links

Life History: Geologic History of Sea Turtles
Bouliachelys at the Paleobiology Database

Early Cretaceous turtles
Turtle genera
Chelonioidea
Early Cretaceous reptiles of Australia
Prehistoric turtle genera
Extinct turtles
Monotypic prehistoric reptile genera